Vieira is a Portuguese and Galician term which in Portuguese and Galician stands for the Great Pilgrim Mussel from the scallop family (Pectinidae). The term derives its use as a place and family name.

History 
The use of the term can be traced, according to current knowledge, to the beginning of the 13th century in northwestern Portugal. The historical writing form of the term Vieira was Vyeyra. It is assumed that the term as a name originated independently in different places (e.g. Vieira do Minho and Vieira de Leiria). As a surname, the term is first found in northwestern Portugal in the province of Minho in the era of Kings D. Afonso II and D. Sancho II of Portugal around 1220 A.D. The historically common spelling Vyeyra is still found at least until the end of the Middle Ages in the mid-16th century.

The modern Portuguese alphabet basically does not recognise the letter Y alongside the K and W, only the 23 letters of the Latin alphabet A, B, C, D, E, F, G, H, I, J, L, M, N, O, P, Q, R, S, T, U, V, X and Z). The letters K, W and Y are still used, but only for names.

At least until the end of the Middle Ages, the use of the letter Y (y) was still common in Portuguese written language, as illustrated, for example, by the following text from the 16th century:... toda junta a quinze dyas de aguosto hou se o tempo que lhe pareçese bem he menos pryguo se espera se lhe fezese faroll da sua naao he pelo pomto do seu pyloto vyese demandar guoa he ele com hos guoleons que fiquavam hatravesase a jmdea pare-. ceu a todos bem he cheguado a naao do fejtor perto do gualeom do gouernador foy hele la em hũ esquyfe a quem deu ho Regymento da maneyra que comprya mais a servyço d ell rej noso senhor he alem deste mandado ha que as fustas provese dese fresquo ho mais que lhe fose necesaryo a quall despedyo de sy ho mesmo dya ja noyte he sy a nau de jorge vyeyra merquador em que levaram consyguo da jmdea quareguada de manty- mentos ha armada com lycença ha hurmuz he hũs na vollta da serra he outros na vollta do mar desapareçerom ...Regarding the term Vieira, the writing with the letter I (i) instead of the Y (y) has basically become established. However, the term written as Vyeyra is still frequently found today using the letter Y (y), in names as Vieyra, Vyeira and Vyeyra.

Vieira as place name 
The place name Vieira may refer to:

 Vieira do Minho
 Vieira de Leiria
 Praia da Vieira
 A Vieira, Galicia

Vieira as surname 
The surname Vieira may refer to:
 Adelino André Vieira de Freitas (Vieirinha, born 1986), Portuguese footballer
 Alessandro Rosa Vieira (Falcão, born 1977), Brazilian futsal player
 Alice Vieira (born 1943), Portuguese writer
 Álvaro Siza Vieira (born 1933), Portuguese architect
 Anton de Vieira (1682?–1745), Russian administrator
 António Vieira (1608–1697), Portuguese diplomat
 Asia Vieira (born 1982), Canadian actress
 Cláudia Vieira (born 1978), Portuguese actress
 Carlos Adriano de Souza Vieira (Adriano Gabiru, born 1977), Brazilian footballer
Fábio Vieira (footballer, born 1991), Portuguese footballer
Fábio Vieira (footballer, born 2000), Portuguese footballer
 Francisco de Matos Vieira (Vieira Lusitano, 1699–1783), Portuguese royal painter, illustrator and engraver
 Jelon Vieira, Brazilian choreographer
 João Bernardo Vieira (1939–2009), Guinea-Bissau politician
 Jorvan Vieira (born 1953), Brazilian-Portuguese football coach
 José Luandino Vieira (born 1935), Angolan writer
 Jussiê Ferreira Vieira (Jussiê, born 1983), Brazilian footballer
 Leonel Vieira (born 1969), Portuguese film director
 Leandro Ricardo Vieira (born 1979), Brazilian footballer
 Luís Filipe Vieira (born 1949), president of S.L. Benfica
 Marcelo Vieira da Silva Júnior (Marcelo, born 1988), Brazilian footballer
 Meredith Vieira (born 1953), American journalist and TV host
 Milton Vieira (born 1978), Brazilian martial artist
 Patrick Vieira (born 1976), French footballer and coach
 Paulo Afonso Evangelista Vieira (born 1958), Brazilian politician
 Ronaldo Vieira (footballer, born 1998), Bissau-Guinean footballer
 Ronaldo Vieira (footballer, born 1990), Brazilian footballer
 Sérgio Vieira de Mello (1948–2003), Brazilian diplomat
 Thyago Vieira (born 1993), Brazilian professional baseball pitcher
 Valdeir Vieira (born 1944), Brazilian football manager
 Vasco Joaquim Rocha Vieira (born 1939), last Portuguese Governor of Macau

References

See also 
 Viera (disambiguation)
 Vieyra
 Vyeyra (pt)

Surnames
Galician-language surnames
Portuguese language
Place names
Place names by language
Portuguese-language surnames
Linguistics
Philology
Romance languages
Galicia (Spain)
Names